Pluton was a Scipion class  74-gun French ship of the line built at Rochefort.

Career 
Pluton took part in the Battle of Martinique on 17 April 1780, under La Marthonie. Albert de Rions took command, and captained her at the Battle of Martinique on 29 April 1781,  at the Battle of the Chesapeake on 5 September 1781, at St. Kitts on 24–25 January 1782, and at the Battle of the Saintes on 12 April.

She was renamed Dugommier in 1797 and seems to have seen little further active service. She was broken up in 1805.

Notes and references
Notes

References

Bibliography
 
 
 

Ships of the line of the French Navy
Scipion-class ships of the line
Ships built in France
1778 ships